WNXT-FM broadcasts on FM in the Portsmouth, Ohio, area at 99.3 MHz and can be heard online from their website at http://www.wnxtradio.com.  WNXT-FM broadcasts contain a mixture of contemporary pop music from the 1970s through today.

External links

NXT-FM
Radio stations established in 1965
1965 establishments in Ohio